Kleinlein is a surname. Notable people with the surname include:

Andreas Kleinlein (1864–1925), German trade unionist and anarchist
 (born 1969), German mathematician
 (1883–1944), German politician

Surnames from nicknames